The following is a list of teams and cyclists that took part in the 2021 Giro d'Italia.

Teams
Twenty-three teams received invitations to participate in the 2021 Giro d'Italia. All nineteen UCI WorldTeams are entitled and obliged to enter the race, and they will be joined by four second-tier UCI ProTeams. , the best performing UCI ProTeam in 2020, received an automatic invitation, while the other three teams were selected by RCS Sport, the organizers of the Giro.  and  continue their streak of wild card invitations to the race, while  will make its Grand Tour debut. The teams were announced on 10 February 2021.

On 15 April 2021, after positive doping tests for Matteo Spreafico and Matteo De Bonis left them facing a potential suspension,  withdrew their participation from the race. In place of them, regular invitee , which had initially been snubbed by race organizers, were awarded the last wildcard invitation.

The teams that participated in the race were:

UCI WorldTeams

 
 
 
 
 
 
 
 
 
 
 
 
 
 
 
 
 
 
 

UCI ProTeams

Cyclists

By starting number

By team

By nationality

References

2021 Giro d'Italia
2021